Podyjí National Park is a national park in the South Moravian Region of the Czech Republic. Adjacent to Austria's Thayatal National Park on the border, together they are referred to as the Inter-National park. Podyjí is one of the Czech Republic's four national parks. It protects near-natural forests along the deep Dyje River valley. The well-preserved state of the biome of the park is cited as being unique in Central Europe.

Legal status
Podyjí National Park is one of the four national parks of the Czech Republic. It was formally declared a national park 1 July 1991 by government order no. 164/1991.

Geography  
Its habitats include forest, grassland, arable land, shrubland, rocky areas and inland wetlands. The park is drained by the Dyje River, which flows for a length of  through the park in a thickly-forested valley within the Českomoravská vrchovina uplands. The river valley's depth measures up . Land use has been established for nature conservation and research, forestry and agriculture. Park trails lead to the castle ruins of Nový Hrádek, Hardegg Castle, and Vranov nad Dyjí Chateau.

Wildlife

The park's valley is home to 77 species of plants, which include oak woods (acidophilous and temperate type), hornbeam, beech, and alder. Some of the perennial flowering species are cyclamen, mulleins, and pasque flower. The upper plateau, which was denuded by logging and converted to cultivable land, contains grasslands. Along the river beds, reed-beds or willow shrubs are noted. Eighteen species of orchids have been recorded.

152 species of bird have been recorded in the park. The IBA trigger species recorded are Syrian woodpecker (Dendrocopos syriacus) and Barred warbler (Sylvia nisoria). The faunal species recorded consist of 65 species of mammals. There are seven species of reptiles, which include a tree snake and green lizard.

Viticulture 

Šobes (or Hora Šobes, English: Šobes Hill), one of the oldest and most renowned vineyard tracks in the Czech Republic, is situated in the park. In 2014, the company Znovín Znojmo who owns 70% of the vineyards at Šobes, started efforts to place the area on the list of UNESCO World Natural Heritage Site. Šobes contains approximately 12 hectares of vineyards.

References

Bibliography

External links

National parks of the Czech Republic
Protected areas established in 1978
Geography of the South Moravian Region
Tourist attractions in the South Moravian Region
Central European mixed forests
1978 establishments in Czechoslovakia